Diana Barrera (born 20 January 1987) is an American-born Guatemalan footballer. She plays for the Guatemala women's national football team and ACF Torino in the Women's Premier Soccer League (WPSL). She previously played for the University at Albany.

See also
List of Guatemala women's international footballers

References

External links 
 Albany player profile
 

1987 births
Living people
People with acquired Guatemalan citizenship
Guatemalan women's footballers
Guatemala women's international footballers
People from Wheaton, Maryland
American people of Guatemalan descent
American sportspeople of North American descent
Sportspeople of Guatemalan descent
American women's soccer players
Soccer players from Maryland
Women's association football forwards
Albany Great Danes women's soccer players